Carmelo Morales Gómez (born 7 July 1978) is a Spanish motorcycle racer.

During his racing career he won three times the Spanish Extreme/Stock Extreme championship (in 2008, 2009 and 2012), once the Spanish Moto2 championship (in 2010), three times the European Superstock title (in 2008, 2009 and 2012), once the European Supersport title (in 2010), twice the FIM CEV Superbike European Championship (in 2015 and 2016) and twice the Spanish Superstock 1000 championship (in 2017 and 2018).

Career statistics

Grand Prix World Championship

By season

Races by year
(key) (Races in bold indicate pole position, races in italics indicate fastest lap)

Superbike World Championship

Races by year
(key) (Races in bold indicate pole position, races in italics indicate fastest lap)

References

External links

 

1978 births
Living people
Spanish motorcycle racers
Motorcycle racers from Catalonia
Moto2 World Championship riders
Superbike World Championship riders